Tom Maddox (October 1945 – October 18, 2022) was an American science fiction writer, known for his part in the early cyberpunk movement.

Maddox's only novel was Halo, published in 1991 by Tor Books. His story "Snake Eyes" appeared in the 1986 collection Mirrorshades, edited by Bruce Sterling. He was perhaps best known as a friend and writing partner of William Gibson. They wrote two episodes of The X-Files together, "Kill Switch" and "First Person Shooter". 

The term Intrusion Countermeasures Electronics (or ICE) was conceived by Maddox. According to him, he coined the term in the manuscript of an unpublished story that he showed to Gibson at a science fiction convention in Portland, Oregon. Gibson asked permission to use the acronym, and Maddox agreed. The term was then used in Gibson's early short stories and eventually popularized in the novel Neuromancer, in which Maddox was properly acknowledged.

Maddox licensed his work under a Creative Commons license, making a significant part of it available on his website: Tom Maddox Fiction and Nonfiction Archive.

Maddox also served as a professor of literary studies at The Evergreen State College in Olympia, Washington.

Maddox died from a stroke on October 18, 2022, at the age of 77.

Works

Novels
 Halo (1991)

Short stories
 "The Mind Like a Strange Balloon" (1985)
 "Snake-Eyes" (1986)
 "The Robot and the One You Love" (1988)
 "Florida" (1989)—not really a short story but a very short broadside—a "bookmark"—contributed to Magicon.
 "Baby Strange" (1989)
 "Gravity's Angel" (1992)
 "Spirit of the Night" (2010)

Footnotes

External links
 An Incomplete Tom Maddox Fiction Archive
 An Incomplete Tom Maddox NonFiction Archive
 Tom Maddox reports on the Electronic Frontier series of articles for Locus Magazine
 
 

1945 births
2022 deaths
People from Beckley, West Virginia
20th-century American novelists
American male novelists
American science fiction writers
Cyberpunk writers
American male short story writers
20th-century American short story writers
20th-century American male writers
Creative Commons-licensed authors
Writers from West Virginia
Evergreen State College faculty